Eraserheads: The Reunion Concert 08.30.08 is a live concert album from the Filipino alternative band Eraserheads; it was released by Musiko Records & Sony BMG Music Entertainment (Philippines), Inc.. The tracks contained in this album are the songs performed by the group during their reunion concert on August 30, 2008.

CD tracks listing
 "Alapaap" - 05:27
 "Ligaya" - 03:46
 "Sembreak" - 03:56
 "Hey Jay" - 04:26
 "Harana" - 05:57
 "Fruitcake" - 04:37
 "Toyang" - 04:10
 "Kamasupra" - 04:36
 "Kailan" - 03:27
 "Huwag Kang Matakot" - 03:04
 "Kaliwete" - 03:03
 "With A Smile" - 05:22
 "Shake Yer Head" - 04:52
 "Huwag Mo Nang Itanong" - 04:24
 "Lightyears" - 04:31

References 
 Sony BMG Philippines Website

Eraserheads albums
2008 live albums